Winter Hill is a hill on which the three boroughs of Chorley, Blackburn with Darwen and Bolton meet, in the historic county of Lancashire in North West England. Part of the West Pennine Moors, it is a popular walking area, and has been the site of mining activity, aeroplane disasters and murders.

Its prominent position made it the ideal site for the Winter Hill TV Mast, transmitting to a large part of North West England. There is also a number of other telecommunication masts and towers around the summit and side of the hill for mobile phones, Professional Mobile Radio users and emergency services. Lancashire Constabulary was the first to use the site for one of their base stations in 1950; they had to build the road and it is said to have been built by policemen.

Paths to the summit lead from Belmont (in Blackburn with Darwen), Rivington (in Chorley borough), and Horwich and Blackrod (in Bolton borough). The hill is a prominent feature on the skyline for most of the borough of Chorley and further afield. Winter Hill's topographic prominence results in it being classified as a Marilyn.

It offers views over Lancashire, Cheshire, Merseyside and the Greater Manchester Urban Area, including Manchester city centre, Salford, Werneth Low, Wigan and Bolton. In clear weather conditions, it also offers views of Blackpool Tower, the Dream in Sutton, St Helens, Jodrell Bank Observatory, Snaefell in the Isle of Man, the Cumbrian mountains, Snowdonia in North Wales, Liverpool, Southport, the Irish Sea, the Pennines and much of the North West of England. On a clear day the summit offers a view of four national parks: the Lake District, Yorkshire Dales, Peak District and Snowdonia.

History
The bare hilltop was once covered by woodland that may have been destroyed by fire and it is thought that the hill was once inhabited, though no remains have been found. There is a Bronze Age round cairn dating from 1600–1400 BC on the hill. In 1883, a local historian recorded the old name for Winter Hill as Edgar Hill, named in connection to Saxon King Edgar

Burial mounds
Two burial mounds dating from the Bronze Age are located near the peak. On 24 March 1957, two men discovered "curved lines of stones" sticking out of the peat forming a two feet high wall which surrounded a raised area in the middle. In July 1958, a group from the University of Manchester excavated the central mound only to find it had been excavated 250 years earlier. The site was thought to have originated from 1500 BC in the Middle Bronze Age.

The second mound was found higher up the hill on the southern edge of Noon Hill. The site was excavated in August 1958 by the Bolton & District Archaeological Society, revealing two lines of stones and human remains.

Two Lads
Two memorial cairns on the hill are known as Wilder Lads or Two Lads. There was a large third cairn built in the 20th century, the remains of the originals are nearby. The site was originally known as 'Wilder Lads', originally united by a circular mound.  The cairns height had been increased by a landowner, noted by local historian Thomas Hampson in 1883, at the time the cairns were thought to be Saxon. Hampson described the original Two Lads as the graves of two children of a Saxon king, Edgar, and recorded that Winter Hill was previously known as Edgar Hill. A legend exists that the cairns mark the site on which two boys lost their way on the moor and died of exposure in a snowstorm. In 1953/54 John Winstanley, Archaeologist had recorded roman finds near this site,  he concluded the site was once a Roman encampment. Flint chippings were found indicating much earlier use of this site.

Scotsman's Stump

On 9 November 1838 George Henderson, a Scottish merchant walking over the hill from Horwich to Blackburn, was murdered by gunshot. A monument was erected in 1912 to replace an earlier bush planted at the spot, sited at the side of the road opposite the television station. Scotsman's Stump was celebrated in a poem entitled 'Scotchman's Stump' by Bolton poet John Cassidy. It was published in his collection  Night Cries, published by Bloodaxe in 1982.

Air disasters

Aircraft crashes around Winter Hill include a two-seater aircraft in the 1920s. During World War II an American Fairchild UC-61 Forwarder (41-54885) of 5th Air Depot Group crashed on 7 August 1942. On 24 December 1943, an Airspeed Oxford (BM837) of 410 Squadron crashed on the hill. Other crashes have included several Spitfires, Hurricanes and a Gloster Meteor which crashed in 1953.

On 27 February 1958 occurred the Winter Hill air disaster, a Silver City Bristol 170 Freighter (G-AICS) travelling from the Isle of Man to Manchester crashed into Winter Hill several hundred yards away from the transmitter. There is a memorial plaque to the accident at the site.

In September 1965 a RAF De Havilland Chipmunk flew into the hill in cloud, without serious injury to the crew. The last crash occurred in October 1968 when a Cessna 172 force-landed between Winter Hill and Rivington Pike.

2018 wildfire

In 2018, a large wildfire broke out on the 28 June. In total, the fire burned for 41 days, and caused a major incident to be declared. A man was later arrested for arson on suspicion of causing the wildfire. The fire, along with the Saddleworth Moor fire (which also burned over 7 square miles of land) has been described by local councillor Brenda Warrington as the "worst series of moor fires in living memory". It has affected local wildlife, killing both flora and fauna in an "internationally important ecosystem" as described by the Woodland Trust. The fire destroyed over a fifth of the moorland on the hill, and it may take a decade to recover fully. Concerns were raised in 2011 to Natural England regarding moorland management with warnings of increased fire risk due to policy of United Utilities to reduce grazing, whilst not using other land management measures including cutting or controlled burning to reduce fire risks.

Rights to Roam
The area is popular with walkers and footpaths and bridleways provide access to the hillside and surrounding moorland. Winter Hill was the site of a mass trespass in 1896 when 10,000 people marched from Bolton to the open countryside in a mass demonstration after the owner of the Smithills Hall estate, Colonel Richard Henry Ainsworth tried to stop public access, the demonstrators repeated the march the following week and were met with no opposition to them accessing the moors, it is considered an early forerunner of the Kinder Scout mass trespass. The demonstration is commemorated by a memorial stone on Coal Pit Lane, below Smithills Moor. 
The hill and surrounding moorland area is open access land with a legally protected right to roam.

Claimed UFO sightings
UFOs have been reported on Winter Hill. In 1950, a witness described a "dark flat iron shaped object hovering close to the ground" and an encounter with a being that returned to a craft before disappearing. In 1999, in what became known as the "Murphy Incident", a farmer said he saw an object hovering over his cattle field. On investigation, the object moved away and the farmer reported the incident to the police. The farmer returned to the field, wearing just a cardigan, and discovered the object had reappeared. He reported the incident to the Manchester Aerial Phenomena Investigation Team (MAPIT), who investigated it. While MAPIT was conducting its investigation, they alleged they were being followed by a green moon-man in a shuttlecock-shaped flying saucer. The farmer reported that he was warned by officials from the Ministry of Agriculture, Fisheries and Food but has not been traced since the incident, and the current owner has not spoken about it.

The UK government released previously classified information on UFO sightings in May 2006; one picture appeared to show an unidentified object over Winter Hill.

References in song
The song "Winter Hill" on A Certain Ratio's 1981 album To Each..., consists of drumming, whistling and a low-pitched drone alternating between two notes a tone apart for its entire length. On a visit to Winter Hill in 1988, a piece of electronic equipment was found which made a high-pitched drone and alternated between two notes a tone apart.

The song "Winter Hill" on Doves' 2009 album Kingdom of Rust, also references the site.

Nearby hill summits

See also
Scheduled monuments in Lancashire

References
Notes

Bibliography

Further reading
 The Devil Casts His Net, Steve Morrin, The Winter Hill Air Disaster.

External links

 Computer generated summit panoramas Winter Hill index
 Tunnels and Mines of Winter Hill
 Free PDF Book: Carboniferous Fossils of Winter Hill & surrounding areas

Marilyns of England
Mountains and hills of Lancashire
Rivington
Tourist attractions in Blackburn
Tourist attractions in the Metropolitan Borough of Bolton
Tourist attractions in Chorley
Hills of the West Pennine Moors
Aviation accidents and incidents locations in England